Qi County or Qixian is a county of Kaifeng, Henan, People's Republic of China, with an area of 1243 square km and a population of 1.05 million.

History
From Shang to Western Zhou, Qi County was the place of the State of Qi.  In Qin Dynasty, Qi was named as Yongqiu (Chinese: 雍丘). It was the site of the Battle of Yongqiu in 756. In Song Dynasty, Yongqiu was renamed to Qi.
Cai Wenji, a Han Dynasty poet and composer, was born shortly before 178 in Yu Prefecture, Chenliu Commandery, in what is now Qi County, Kaifeng, Henan.

Administrative divisions
Qi County has 8 towns and 13 townships.

Towns 
, Wulihe, Fuji, Yuzhen, Gaoyang, Gegang, Yanggu, Xingkou

Townships 
, Zongdian, Banmu, Zhulin, Guanzhuang, Hugang, Sumu, Shahuo, Pingcheng, Nigou, Shiyuan, XIzhai, Chengjiao

Climate

Notable people
 Cai Yong (132—192), musician and calligrapher of Han Dynasty.
 Cai Wenji (177--?), poet and composer of Han Dynasty, Cai Yong's daughter.
 Mu Qing (1921—2003), journalist, author and photographer.

References

External links
  Official website of Qi County government

County-level divisions of Henan
Kaifeng